The Berries are an American rock band signed to Run for Cover Records. The band consists of members of the bands Happy Diving and Big Bite. On October 26, 2018, The Berries released their first album titled Start All Over Again. The group issued their second album, Berryland, in 2019. In August 2022, High Flying Man was released as the ensemble's third album.

Discography

Studio albums
Start All Over Again (Run for Cover, 2018)
Berryland (Run for Cover, 2019)
High Flying Man (Run for Cover, 2022)

References

Run for Cover Records artists
Musical groups established in 2018
American rock music groups
2018 establishments in the United States